= John Wohlhieter =

American biologist

John A. Wohlhieter is an American biologist and an Elected Fellow of the American Association for the Advancement of Science.
